Dave Grosz (b. August 24, 1938 - d. September 20, 2018) was a Canadian football quarterback in the Canadian Football League (CFL) who played for the Saskatchewan Roughriders and Montreal Alouettes. He played college football for the Oregon Ducks.

References

1938 births
2018 deaths
American football quarterbacks
Canadian football quarterbacks
Edmonton Elks players
Montreal Alouettes players
Oregon Ducks football players
Saskatchewan Roughriders players